Robert Seymour may refer to:

 Robert Seymour (MP) (1480–1545), MP for Heytesbury
 Lord Robert Seymour (1748–1831), British politician 
 Robert Seymour (illustrator) (1798–1836), caricaturist and illustrator, including The Pickwick Papers by Charles Dickens
 Robert Seymour (loyalist) (1955–1988), Northern Irish loyalist and member of the Ulster Volunteer Force
 Bob Seymour (1916–1977), American football running back